Quality time is an expression referring to how an individual proactively interacts with another while they are together, regardless of the duration.

Overview
Sometimes abbreviated QT, it is an informal reference to time spent with close family, partners or friends that is in some way important, special, productive or profitable to one or everyone involved. It is time that is set aside for paying full and undivided attention to the person or matter at hand. It may also refer to time spent performing some favorite activity.

Relationship counselor Gary Chapman suggests that quality time is one of five "languages" which are used (more or less, preferentially, by a given individual) to express love and articulate their feelings and emotions.

History
Its use as a noun expression ("quality time") began in the 1970s. One of the earliest records of this phrase in print was in the Annapolis newspaper The Capital, January 1973, in the article "How To Be Liberated":

The Time Bind, a 1997 book, was mentioned in Newsweek's multi-page feature about  Quality Time. The same issue of Newsweek had a full page review of another 1997 book, Time for Life, which had as a major point flaws in most people's "ability to separate faulty perception of time use from reality." Author Robinson's diary-based research shows that 15 hours per week of "free time" (the greatest category of time used) goes into TV viewing.

See also
 Double burden
 Gemütlichkeit
 Kids' club
 Work–family balance in the United States
 Work–family conflict
 Work–life balance

References

External links
 The Idioms
 The Phrase Finder

Family
Interpersonal relationships
Personal life
Sociological terminology
1970s neologisms